Facebook Watch is a service that provides streaming of videos hosted by Facebook and access to "Facebook Original" series, shows that receive funding from Facebook.

For short-form videos, Facebook originally had a budget of roughly $10,000-$40,000 per episode, though renewal contracts have placed the budget in the $50,000-$70,000-range. Long-form TV-length series have budgets between $250,000 to over $1 million. The Wall Street Journal reported in September 2017 that the company was willing to spend up to $1 billion on original video content through 2018.

The service officially launched as Facebook Watch on August 10, 2017.

Original programming

Drama

Comedy

Continuations

Docu-series

Animation

Game show

Live sports

News programs

Reality show

Talk show

Upcoming original programming

Ordered

In development

Exclusive international distribution

These television shows, even though Facebook lists them as Facebook Watch originals, are shows that have been aired in different countries, and Facebook has bought exclusive distribution rights to stream them in other various countries. They may be available on Facebook Watch in their home territory and other markets where Facebook Watch does not have the first run license, without the Facebook Watch Original label, some time after their first-run airing on their original broadcaster.

References

External links
 

Facebook
Facebook Watch
Facebook Watch